The 2010–11 Maltese First Division Knock-Out was a knockout tournament for Maltese football clubs playing in the First Division. The competition was held between 18 September 2010 and 13 May 2011, with the winners being Dingli Swallows.

Group stage

Group 1

Group 2

Knockout phase

Semi-finals

|colspan="3" style="background:#fcc;"|7 May 2011

|}

Final

|colspan="3" style="background:#fcc;"|13 May 2011

|}

See also
 2010–11 Maltese First Division

External links
http://www.maltafootball.com/results-fixtures/cups-knock-outs/first-division-knock-out/
http://www.maltafootball.com/2011/05/13/dingli-win-maltco-lotteries-first-division-knock-out/

Maltese First Division knock-out
knock-out